Erik Waller (1875–1955) was a Swedish surgeon and book collector.

Waller collected some 20,000 important books on science and medicine, including 150 incunabula and other early editions. In his last will and testament he left the whole collection to Uppsala University and its library. A catalogue of the collection was with the greatest competence and care compiled by Hans Sallander and published in two volumes, Uppsala 1955. It includes some fifty plates, reproducing selected interesting items from the collection. Waller's collection of medals relating to the history of medicine is housed by the Uppsala University Coin Cabinet.

Literature

 Bibliotheca Walleriana: the books illustrating the history of medicine and science collected by Dr. Erik Waller, and bequeathed to the Library of the Royal University of Uppsala; a catalogue. Stockholm, 1955.
 Harald Nilsson, Erik Wallers samling av medicinhistoriska medaljer (Studia Numismatica Upsaliensia 8), Uppsala 2013.

External links
 Erik Waller's book collection at Uppsala University Library (20.000 titles)
 Erik Waller's manuscript collection at Uppsala University Library (38.000 documents)
 Waller pages at The Uppsala University Library web site
 Holdings that are related to Erik Waller on Alvin portal

1875 births
1955 deaths
Swedish surgeons
Book and manuscript collectors
Karolinska Institute alumni